Freemake Video Downloader is a crippleware download manager for Microsoft Windows, developed by Ellora Assets Corporation. It is proprietary software that can download online video and audio. Both HTTP and HTTPS protocols are supported. Users must purchase a premium upgrade to remove Freemake branding on videos and unlock the ability to download media longer than 3 minutes in length.

Features 
The GUI provides several modal windows that help to access different program features, including download progress, download queue, output file saving options, download history, program settings.

Technical capabilities 
 Batch downloading support for downloading multiple files
 Flash and HTML5 video download from sites like YouTube and Google Video
 Pausing and resuming downloads
 Enables YouTube playlists, favorites, charts, channels download
 Video conversion of downloaded files into list of predefined formats which are supported by the program

Premium Pack 
Users may purchase (communicated as a "donation" in the software's dialog) a Premium Pack to unlock features such as full-speed downloading and disabling of the added Freemake branding in all downloaded media.
 Download videos longer than 3 minutes in length
 Removal of Freemake branding in all downloaded videos
 Download speed control (limited in the free to try version)
 Download via proxy connection
 Automatic file export to Apple iTunes

Technical requirements 
 OS: Windows 7 and above
 Processor: 1 GHz or higher
 RAM: 1 GB or higher
 Disk space: 30 MB
 .NET Framework 4.5

Criticism 
Freemake Video Downloader is criticized for toolbar and web search engine installation. Freeware offers to install sponsored software upon installation changing default search engine and browsers homepage. Users may opt-out of sponsored software, but it has been criticized on several pages.

See also
 Comparison of YouTube downloaders
 Comparison of download managers

References

External links 
 
 Official download

2010 software
Freeware
Windows multimedia software
Download managers